Mixed brigade was a basic tactical military unit of the Republican army during the Spanish Civil War. It was initially designed as “pocket division”, an innovative maneuverable combined-arms formation. Because of high saturation with specialized troops and services it would have resembled a division, but in terms of manpower it would have been much smaller and amount to some 3,700 men.

Shortages of career officers and NCOs plus inability to provide arms and equipment needed rendered the original mixed brigade pattern unworkable. The Republican general staff kept redrafting the scheme with decreasing proportion of non-infantry sub-units, though even these arrangements proved impossible to implement. Most of 188 mixed brigades raised during the war were closer to the infantry regiment blueprint.

Assumptions about nature of the warfare which gave rise to the mixed brigade concept were largely correct. However, the Republic could not have afforded such highly-specialized and well-equipped unit. Attempts to implement the scheme put extra strain on the Republican recruitment and logistics system; as a result, the mixed brigade scheme was counterproductive and worked to the detriment of the Republican military capacity.

Origins

Origins of the mixed brigade concept are not clear and in historiography there are various theories which point to its beginnings. One is related to debates within the Spanish general staff of the 1920s; banking on experiences of the Rif War, some officers suggested formation of relatively small, flexible combined-arms units. In the early 1930s and influenced by Swiss attempts, two Brigadas Mixtas were ordered to be formed as Spanish mountain troops. During further discussions of the mid-1930s the idea that the Spanish army should include a large number of autonomous units smaller than división organica was gradually taking root.

A somewhat competitive theory claims that the concept was merely an acknowledgement of warfare reality during first weeks of the Civil War. During July, August and September of 1936 most fighting took place between improvised, relatively small, lightly armed and highly maneuverable groups, usually referred to as “columns”. The Republican general staff reportedly concluded that they should turn this makeshift model into a systematic and structured scheme and units raised in this way should emphasize mobility and flexibility rather than manpower. One more theory credits Soviet military advisers, present in Spain since early October 1936, for coining the concept; one version of this theory holds that the Soviets merely encouraged the Republican general staff to implement the idea which had already been in circulation for some time.

Underlying concept: “pocket division”

The basic assumption which triggered emergence of the mixed brigade concept was that the war in Spain would be about flexibility rather than manpower. Such a vision elicited the idea that the key army unit should be able to operate independently, without support of other specialized units typically assigned to larger military formations (e.g. unlike a typical infantry regiment, which requires support of other divisional services to achieve military objectives). This in turn produced a conclusion that the key army unit should be a highly maneuverable, combined-arms formation.

The resulting vision was this of a “little great unit”, “division en miniatura” or a “pocket division”: a unit which in terms of manpower would be much smaller than a division, but which would reproduce some of divisional features by means of large proportion of specialized and support sub-units. This vision was eventually embodied in a scheme of a “mixed brigade”; the term “mixed” was to indicate its combined-arms composition, making it different from a typical infantry unit of comparable size. Mixed brigades were supposed to operate independently and to be grouped into a larger formation only for the purpose of waging a particular campaign or battle, but not as its permanent components.

Theoretical composition

The original scheme as worked out in 1936 envisioned that a mixed brigade would be made of 3,700 soldiers. Internal composition was to be as follows:

 brigade staff
 4 infantry battalions. Each battalion was to consist of 4 infantry companies, 1 machine-gun company and 1 platoon of mortars. In comparison the regular army division, named “división orgánica”, was composed of 2 brigades, each brigade composed of 2 regiments, each regiment composed of 3 battalions
 1 field artillery group. It was to be composed of 4 batteries of medium artillery (usually 75 mm guns) and 1 battery of heavy artillery (usually 105 mm guns). In comparison the regular army division was to consist of 1 regiment of light artillery and 1 regiment of heavy howitzers
 1 cavalry squadron (in alternative versions replaced with motorized infantry). In comparison the regular army division was also to include 1 squadron, on wartime footing enlarged to 1 cavalry regiment
 1 pioneer company. The regular army division was to incorporate 1 battalion of pioneers
 1 motorized reconnaissance squadron
 1 communication and logistics group. It was to consist of dedicated communication (including radio transmission), intendancy and supply-logistics sub-units
 other support sub-units, including a sanitary and medical detachment

In terms of manpower the mixed brigade as originally envisioned was in-between a regular army infantry regiment and a regular brigade. In terms of firepower it would have been stronger than a brigade. In most European armies of the late 1930s (which unlike the Spanish army did not feature brigades as fixed divisional units) it would have been comparable to a very strong regiment. In terms of modus operandi and because of its general autonomy a mixed brigade was somewhat resemblant of a division.

Implementation problems

Not a single unit has ever been raised in line with the original plan, all units named brigadas mixtas differed significantly and then very significantly from the scheme, and the entire original concept remained largely on paper. Initially the reason were pressing wartime necessities; the Nationalist army was approaching Madrid and half-formed units were thrown into battle before they reached the structure envisioned. Later it turned out that the Republic was unable to provide all weapons and equipment needed, and that shortage of NCOs and officers made it impossible to ensure their sufficient number even for traditional army units. Finally, in later stages of the war the increasingly dramatic military situation forced Republican high command to raise troops in non-systematic, makeshift manner.

Because of problems with raising mixed brigades in line with the original plan, the Republican general staff was continuously re-drafting their structure; the change was generally about reducing the weight of non-infantry components and enlarging infantry battalions (eventually from 633 to 828 men). The result was decreasing firepower and increasing manpower of the entire unit; final versions of the brigada mixta scheme envisioned its strength as some 4,200 people, though less than a half would serve in frontline combat sub-units. However, neither these revised plans have been implemented and brigada mixta theoretical schemes as developed in 1937-1938 remained a blueprint intended, but never fully put into practice.

Practice

The concept of mixed brigades was discussed during sittings of the Republican government in late September 1936; the first known military document which refers to raising of these units is dated October 18, 1936 and the first 6 units were created shortly. By December 1936 there were 15 brigades deployed, and by the spring of 1937 there were 40 units operational. Those formed in central Spain were numbered 1-50, those raised in the Levante and Andalusia were numbered 51-82, whose those built in the North were numbered until 189. The last brigade formed was numbered 246 and was created in December 1938, though the number of units actually raised which entered combat was around 190. Most of the build-up process was controlled by the military. Manpower was provided by distributing pre-war regiments among the brigades, by incorporating earlier militia units active on the front, and then by regular draft (though there were also volunteers).

Units raised as mixed brigades resembled rather a traditional infantry regiment. Their strength was some 3,500 men, though the number of rifles available was below 2,000; in practice an average unit counted some 1,600-1,800 rifles. In all 188 units created there were only 49 career officers acting either as commanders or chiefs of staff. Non-infantry sub-units were increasingly smaller; as general staff experts noted artillery was too dispersed, to gain critical mass guns and howitzers were shifted to divisional units. Deployment of mixed brigades differed significantly from the original plan; instead of operating as autonomous units, they were grouped by 3 into divisions and remained their fixed components. However, the concept of brigada mixta resulted in some change of divisional tactics. Though in terms of manpower (some 14,000 people) comparable to a Nationalist division, the Republican division was more loosely organized and its sub-components retained much greater autonomy.

Evaluation

Scholars note that the underlying assumptions which gave rise to the mixed brigade concept were basically correct, and that the nature of warfare during the Spanish Civil War indeed favored mobility, flexibility and autonomy over structure, manpower and hierarchical organization. They also note that the innovative idea of creating combined-arms units below the divisional level was later successfully implemented during World War Two in form of the improvised German Kampfgruppen. However, they also noted that the mixed brigade scheme was one that the Republic could not have afforded, and that attempts to implement it produced more harm than good.

The key point raised is that mixed brigades required even more specialists, NCOs, and career officers than pre-war brigades; as the Republic faced dramatic shortages of skilled military men, enforcing the scheme made matters even worse. Another point is that the Republic was unable to provide sufficient equipment and arms, and as a result the non-infantry sub-units remained to a large extent an under-armed and under-equipped fiction. Finally, it is noted that the mixed brigade pattern was a “waste of men”, as an unusually high proportion of soldiers were assigned to non-combat roles. Favorable comments are related not that much to the mixed brigade itself, but rather to its role within larger military units. It is noted that divisions formed from mixed brigades were more flexible, and that loose organisation of such divisions allowed greater efficiency when manoeuvre and relatively open front determined the nature of military operations. However, otherwise the mixed-brigade-based organisation might have contributed to chaos.

Mixed Brigades 
The Mixed Brigades of the International Brigades are in Roman numerals.

1st to 100th

101st to 200th

201st to 246th

See also
 Spanish Republican Armed Forces
 Fifth Regiment
 Military organization
 International Brigades
 Si me quieres escribir
 Brigade combat team: Modern military unit based on the concept of a combined-arms brigade formation

Bibliography
 Alpert, Michael (19893); The Republican Army in the Spanish Civil War, 1936-19399, Cambridge University Press.

 Salas Larrazábal, Ramón (2006); Historia del Ejército Popular de la República. La Esfera de los Libros S.L.

References

External links
SBHAC - Guía de Brigadas Mixtas
The International Brigades in the Spanish War 1936-1939: Flags and Symbols
Arab volunteers in the Spanish Mixed Brigades
Las Brigadas Mixtas según Carlos Engel (1.999)
Las Brigadas Mixtas según Mike Blacksmith
La Evolución de las Brigadas Mixtas.
Las Brigadas Mixtas según Ciutat y Rojo (1.974 y 1.967)
Las Brigadas Mixtas según Alpert (1.977)